Outernet may refer to:
 The previous name of the company Othernet
 Outernet (novel series), a humorous series of children's science fiction books written by Steve Barlow and Steve Skidmore
 Outernet (network), a wireless community network based in Poland
 Outernet London, a mixed use urban development
 Notes from the Outernet, a 2011 limited edition book of intimate photographs taken by Jared Leto